Uzmitsa is a rural locality (a village) in Korobitsynskoye Rural Settlement, Syamzhensky District, Vologda Oblast, Russia. The population was 19 as of 2002.

Geography 
Uzmitsa is located 39 km east of Syamzha (the district's administrative centre) by road. Podgornaya is the nearest rural locality.

References 

Rural localities in Syamzhensky District